Nord-Ubangi (French for "North Ubangi") is one of the 21 new provinces of the Democratic Republic of the Congo created in the 2015 repartitioning. Nord-Ubangi, Équateur, Mongala, Sud-Ubangi, and Tshuapa provinces are the result of the dismemberment of the former Équateur province.

The province is located in the northwestern part of the country on the Ubangi River and was formed from the Nord-Ubangi district and the independently administered city of Gbadolite which became the capital of the new province.

Administration
The capital is the city of Gbadolite.
It is divided into four territories:
 Bosobolo 
 Businga
 Mobayi-Mbongo 
 Yakoma

References

 
Provinces of the Democratic Republic of the Congo